The Theban Necropolis is a necropolis on the west bank of the Nile, opposite Thebes (Luxor) in Upper Egypt. It was used for ritual burials for much of the Pharaonic period, especially during the New Kingdom.

Mortuary temples

 Deir el-Bahri
 Mortuary temple of Hatshepsut
 Mortuary temple of Mentuhotep II
 Mortuary temple of Thutmose III
 Medinet Habu
 Mortuary temple and palace of Ramesses III
 Mortuary Temple of Ay & Horemheb
 Mortuary Temple of Amenhotep III
 Colossi of Memnon
 Mortuary Temple of Merneptah
 Mortuary Temple of Ramesses IV
 Mortuary Temple of Thutmose IV
 Mortuary Temple of Thutmose III
 Mortuary Temple of Twosret
 Temple of Nebwenenef
 Qurna
 Mortuary Temple of Seti I
 Mortuary Temple of Amenhotep II
 Ramesseum (Mortuary Temple of Ramesses II)

Royal Necropolis
 Valley of the Kings (Modern: "Wadi el-Muluk")
 Valley of the Queens (Modern: "Biban el-Harim")
 Royal Cache
 Bab el-Gasus

Necropolis
 Deir el-Medina
 Workmen's Tombs
 Shrine to Meretseger & Ptah
 Tombs of the Nobles
 el-Assasif
 el-Khokha
 el-Tarif
 Dra' Abu el-Naga'
 Qurnet Murai
 Sheikh Abd el-Qurna

See also

 Beautiful festival of the valley
 List of Theban Tombs

External links
 Theban Mapping Project

 
Archaeological sites in Egypt
Open-air museums in Egypt
Necropoleis
Thebes, Egypt